Leopold Robert may refer to:

 Dr. Leopold Robert, first director of the Queen Saovabha Memorial Institute
 Louis Léopold Robert (1794–1835), Swiss painter